Andreas Muñoz (born 4 April 1990) is a Spanish actor.

Early life 
Andreas Muñoz was born in Madrid, Spain, in 1990. His is the eldest in a family of actors including Gara and Omar Muñoz, and son of Luís Mariano Muñoz and María Dolores Blázquez.

Muñoz began his professional acting career at the age of nine, debuting in the film The Devil's Backbone, directed by Guillermo del Toro. A few years later he received his first starring role in the TV series Dime que me quieres ["Tell me that you love me"], with Imanol Arias and Lydia Bosch.

Muñoz also studied music as a child, learning piano and drums, and presently performs with a band as drummer and singer.  He studied drama at Royal School of Dramatic Art (RESAD) and is currently studying acting at the Royal Conservatoire of Scotland in Glasgow.

Muñoz became known on the international stage through his work at Disney Channel Spain. Because of his fluency in English, he traveled to the United States with the entire Disney Channel Spain crew for the Disney Channel Games and worked as presenter during the show. Since then he has started to appear in ads in English for Disney Channel USA.

Career

Film

Leading roles 
 Arena en los bolsillos
This movie, directed by Cesar Martínez Herrada, was Muñoz' first leading role in a Spanish film.
 
Arena en los bolsillos is a film about 4 young boys, Iván, Lionel, Jenny and Elena, from a neighborhood on the outskirts of Madrid. They plan a journey to the sea to escape from all the misery around them and on the way to find love and solidarity. During their journey they leave their signature on the walls ... a "graffiti" is their hallmark.

 Ignacio de Loyola

Muñoz plays the title role of St. Ignatius of Loyola in this Philippine production.

Supporting roles

Television

Main character

Supporting roles

TV host

Theater and others

Awards and recognition
Muñoz was awarded "Best Actor" at the 2008 NoteCortes FilmFest for his performance in the short film Paredes, directed by Jorge Galerón.

Sources 
 

1990 births
Living people
Spanish male child actors
Spanish male film actors
Spanish male television actors